Damodar Himalaya is a mountain range in Gandaki Province.

Peaks

References 

Mountain ranges of Nepal
Mountain ranges of Tibet
Mountains of the Gandaki Province